Jaroslava Blažková (15 November 1933 – 20 February 2017) was a Slovak novelist, short story writer, children's writer and journalist.

Biography
Born in Velké Meziříčí in what is now the Czech Republic, she first attended secondary school in Prague but completed her schooling in Bratislava. After her studies in the philosophical department of Comenius University in Bratislava, in 1954 she worked as a journalist and freelance writer. In the early 1960s, she became one of the most important contributors to Mladá Tvorba, a literary journal for young people. She was also a key member of the so-called Generation 56 group of young authors, publishing innovative short stories in Mladá tvorba, Kultúrny život and other journals, written in a colloquial style with ironic overtones. Her successful novella Nylonový mesiac (Nylon Moon, 1961), which later formed the basis of a screenplay, is a good example. Her emphasis on the emancipation of her heroines can be seen in her collection of short stories Jahniatko a grandi (Lambs and Grandees, 1964). Her novel Môj skvelý brat Robinson (My Excellent Brother Robinson, 1968) is aimed at a young-adult readership, telling the story of rivalry between two brothers for the heroine and bringing out the tensions between the older generation and the new approach of youth.

After the Soviet invasion of Czechoslovakia in 1968, she emigrated to Canada, settling in Toronto. Her books were no longer published in Czechoslovakia but she joined the Slovak service of the Canadian Broadcasting Corporation in Montreal, edited Nový domov (a magazine for émigrés) and worked for Josef Škvorecký's publishing house 68 Publishers. She lived in Guelph, Ontario, but frequently visited Slovakia where her books have been republished.

Works

For adults
1961: Nylonový mesiac
1964: Jahniatko a grandi, short stories and novellas
1968: Môj skvelý brat Robinson, novel
1997: ... ako z gratulačnej karty (prose works)
2001: Svadba v Káne Galilejskej, short stories
2005: Happyendy
2013: To decko je blázon (Zo spomienok rozmaznanej dcérušky)

For children

Tóno, ja a mravce, educational book
Ostrov kapitána Hašašara, educational book
Ohňostroj pre deduška, humorous work
Daduška a jarabáč, picture book for small children
Ako si mačky kúpili televízor, fairy tale
Rozprávky z červenej ponožky, stories
Minka a pyžaminka
Traja nebojsovia a duch Miguel
Mačky vo vreci, funny stories

References

1933 births
2017 deaths
People from Velké Meziříčí
20th-century Slovak women writers
20th-century Slovak writers
Slovak writers
Slovak journalists
Slovak children's writers
Slovak women children's writers
Slovak novelists
21st-century Slovak women writers
21st-century Slovak writers
Czechoslovak emigrants to Canada
Czechoslovak exiles